Inonotus is a genus of fungi in the family Hymenochaetaceae. The genus, described by Petter Karsten in 1879, is estimated to contain about 80 species sensu lato and 30 species sensu stricto (in the strict sense).

The name comes from ino meaning fibrous and ot meaning ear.

Species

Inonotus acutus
Inonotus adnatus
Inonotus afromontanus
Inonotus albertinii
Inonotus amazonicus
Inonotus andersonii
Inonotus arizonicus
Inonotus australiensis
Inonotus austropusillus
Inonotus boninensis
Inonotus chihshanyenus
Inonotus chilanshanus
Inonotus chrysomarginatus
Inonotus clemensiae
Inonotus costaricensis
Inonotus crocitinctus
Inonotus cuticularis
Inonotus dentatus
Inonotus dentiporus
Inonotus diverticuloseta
Inonotus dryadeus
Inonotus dryophilus
Inonotus duostratosus
Inonotus euphoriae
Inonotus farlowii
Inonotus fimbriatus
Inonotus flammans
Inonotus flavidus
Inonotus fulvomelleus
Inonotus glomeratus
Inonotus gracilis
Inonotus griseus – China
Inonotus hamusetulus
Inonotus hastifer
Inonotus hemmesii
Inonotus hispidus
Inonotus japonicus
Inonotus juniperinus
Inonotus leporinus
Inonotus lloydii
Inonotus ludovicianus
Inonotus luteoumbrinus
Inonotus marginatus
Inonotus micantissimus
Inonotus microsporus
Inonotus mikadoi
Inonotus minutoporus
Inonotus munzii
Inonotus navisporus
Inonotus neotropicus
Inonotus nidus-pici
Inonotus niveomarginatus
Inonotus nodulosus
Inonotus nothofagi
Inonotus novoguineensis
Inonotus obliquus
Inonotus ochroporus
Inonotus pacificus
Inonotus palmicola
Inonotus papyrinus
Inonotus patouillardii
Inonotus pegleri
Inonotus peristrophidis
Inonotus pertenuis
Inonotus poncei
Inonotus porrectus
Inonotus pseudoglomeratus
Inonotus pseudoradiatus
Inonotus pusillus
Inonotus quercustris
Inonotus radiatus
Inonotus rheades
Inonotus rickii
Inonotus rigidus
Inonotus rodwayi
Inonotus setulosocroceus
Inonotus shoreae
Inonotus sideroides
Inonotus splitgerberi
Inonotus tabacinus
Inonotus tamaricis
Inonotus tenuissimus
Inonotus triqueter
Inonotus ungulatus
Inonotus venezuelicus
Inonotus xanthoporus
Inonotus xeranticus

References

 
Agaricomycetes genera
Taxa named by Petter Adolf Karsten